Richard B. Wathen (June 26, 1917 – March 14, 2001) was an American politician, journalist, and author. He was a Republican member of the Indiana House of Representatives between 1973 and 1990.

Wathen was born in Jeffersonville, Indiana. He comes from a family of Kentucky Bourbon makers.  His father Otho H. Wathen, President of American Medicinal Spirits Company, and his brother Otho H. Wathen, Jr. were in the distilling business.  He attended Princeton University.  He received his law degree from Indiana University in 1942 and was admitted to the Indiana Bar.  As World War II was going on, joined the United States Navy as an officer serving on the aircraft carrier Guadalcanal (CVE-60).  He was part of the party that captured  on June 4, 1944 and received a Presidential Unit Citation.  He later rose to the rank of Commander.

While serving his country took Wathen away from home for many years, including a lot of time in Washington, upon his father's death in 1964, Wathen returned home to Jeffersonville, Indiana.  He practice law there for many years.   In addition to his service in the Indiana House of Representatives, Wathen once challenged Congressman Lee H. Hamilton but was not successful.

Wathen had three children one of whom also became an attorney.  Out of his seven grandchildren, Alexander B. Wathen, also followed the family calling and currently practices law in Texas.  One of Wathen's sons and one of his grandchildren also served in the military.

Wathen died on March 14, 2001, from throat cancer after a few months of illness.

Authored books
Cliffs of Fall (1958) (New Orleans, Publications Press) PS3545.A81 C6, 	 PZ4.W333 Cl
The Only Yankee (1970) (Chicago, Regnery Publishing) 73-124731
Wathen's Law: The Hang-Ups of a Politician (1981) (Chicago, Regnery Publishing) 
Legislative history of Clark County, 1972-84  (1984) JS451.I69 C55 1984

External links
Indiana General Assembly
Indiana Lawyers in the Legislature
About American Medicinal Spirits Company
 Picture of Richard Wathen with visiting pages at the House of Representatives in Indianapolis in 1990.

1917 births
2001 deaths
Members of the Indiana House of Representatives
Princeton University alumni
20th-century American politicians